Biwi (meaning wife in Urdu) may refer to:

Films & TV Series 
Biwi-O-Biwi, a  1981 romantic-comedy Hindi movie.
Biwi No.1,  a 1999 Indian Hindi-language comedy film.
Saheb, Biwi Aur Gangster, a 2011 Indian romantic thriller film
Saheb, Biwi Aur Gangster 3, is a 2018 Indian crime thriller film
Saheb, Biwi Aur Gangster Returns, is a 2013 Indian romantic thriller drama film directed by Tigmanshu Dhulia
Meri Hanikarak Biwi, is an Indian drama series that airs on &TV and stars Karan Suchak and Jiya Shankar
Meri Biwi Ka Jawaab Nahin, is a 2004 Indian film directed by Pankaj Parashar
Biwi Ho To Aisi, is a 1988 Bollywood film, directed and written by J.K. Bihari
Dusri Biwi, is a 2014 Pakistani drama serial directed by Anjum Shahzad
Sahib Biwi Gulam, is a 2004 Indian television series aired on Sahara One channel
Meri Biwi Ki Shaadi, is a 1979 Bollywood comedy film directed by Rajat Rakshit
Mujhe Meri Biwi Se Bachaao, is a 2001 Indian film directed by Harry Baweja
Biwi Aur Makan, is a 1966 Hindi film directed by Hrishikesh Mukherjee
Sahib Biwi Aur Boss, is a 2015 Indian television sitcom, aired on SAB TV
Naukar Biwi Ka, is a 1983 Hindi comedy film, a remake of the Punjabi film Naukar Wohti Da (1974)
Aashiq Biwi Ka, is a 2009 Hindi language Indian comedy series aired on DD National channel
TV, Biwi aur Main, is a 2017 Indian sitcom series aired on SAB TV
Jo Biwi Se Kare Pyaar, a 2013 Indian television series aired on SAB TV
Mian Biwi Razi, is a 1982 comedy–drama film directed by Sangeeta
Maa Bahen Aur Biwi,  is a 1974 Bollywood drama film directed by Harbans Kumar.
Kiski Biwi, is a 1942 Bollywood film

Places 
Biwi, Malawi,  a populated place in Lilongwe District, Central Region, Malawi.